Hypocharassus farinosus is a species of fly in the family Dolichopodidae.

Distribution
Taiwan

References

Hydrophorinae
Diptera of Asia
Insects described in 1922
Taxa named by Theodor Becker